The Speedway of Nations is a speedway event for national teams, held each year in a different country. The first edition of the competition in the current format took place in 2018, replacing the Speedway World Cup on the international calendar. It was the first time an official FIM international pairs competition was staged since the World Pairs Championship ceased in 1993. Australia are the current champions after winning in 2022.

Format
Each meeting is staged between seven national teams, with each national team represented by two riders. A third rider, who must be aged 21 years or under, acts as a reserve and can be used at any time. Each pairing rides against each other once. The combined total of each pair will be used to determine the outcome.

Two semi-finals are held in different countries, with the top three teams in each progressing to the final. The final is then staged between the hosts and the six qualified nations. It takes places over two rounds, with the second and third placed nations progressing to the semi-final, which is a single race. The winner of the semi-final faces the first placed nation in the Grand Final. The Grand Final winners are crowned Speedway of Nations champions.

Winners

By season

2020 Finished after 14 Heats due to bad weather condition. Russia awarded gold as they beat Poland in Heat 8.

Medal classification

Rider classification

See also
Speedway Grand Prix
Team Speedway Junior World Championship (U-21)
List of world championships

References

External links
Speedway World Cup - Official Site

 
Speedway competitions
World cups
Speedway of Nations